Lauren Stamile (born September 12, 1976) is an American actress. She is best known for portraying Nurse Rose on the ABC series Grey's Anatomy, Michelle Slater on the NBC series Community, and CIA Agent Dani Pearce on the USA Network series Burn Notice.

Early life
Stamile was born in Tulsa, Oklahoma, the third of five siblings. She is of Italian descent. During her teenage years, she worked in restaurants. She graduated from Cascia Hall Preparatory School. Her father is a physician and her mother is a nurse. She majored in theater at Northwestern University in Evanston, Illinois, and then moved to New York City, New York to pursue an acting career.

Career
Stamile has appeared in commercials for Old Spice, JC Penney, Summer's Eve, Tassimo, and Volkswagen. She appeared in a 2000 episode of The Drew Carey Show, then co-starred in the WB sitcom Off Centre. After that show's cancellation, she had a series of guest roles in television shows such as Drop Dead Diva, Without a Trace, CSI: Miami, Cold Case, Boston Legal, Community, Grey's Anatomy, The Good Guys, Crossing Jordan, Tru Calling, The West Wing, Summerland, and Scrubs. She also starred in the 2009 film Midnight Bayou. Stamile joined the cast of Burn Notice for the fifth and sixth seasons. Her stage credits include The Miser, Murder on the Nile, Lion in Winter, and Lounge Act.

Personal life
Stamile married writer Randy Zamcheck in April 2009.

Filmography

Film

Television

References

External links

1976 births
American television actresses
American people of Italian descent
Living people
Northwestern University School of Communication alumni
Actresses from Tulsa, Oklahoma
Actresses from Los Angeles
20th-century American actresses
21st-century American actresses